Khadija Qalanjo is a popular Somali singer and folklore dancer in the 1970s and 1980s. She was the first miss Somalia.

Qalanjo was the singer that started the modernization and enhancement of the Somali folk song tradition of balwo, introducing instrumentation where hitherto it had been performed without.

She was born in Borama in north western Somaliland.

Music
Popular songs by Qalanjo include:

Caashaqa Sal iyo Baar
Ragga iyo Haweenkuba
Deesha
Sharaf
Hooyo
Soohor Caashaqa – duet with Hasan Adan Samatar
Diriyam –   in 2016 a cover was made by the Ethiopian Jano Band.

Notes

References

Year of birth missing (living people)
Living people
20th-century Somalian women singers
Somalian Muslims
People from Awdal
Gadabuursi